The Grass Is Greener is an album by Colosseum, released in January 1970.

In contrast to other albums by Colosseum, The Grass Is Greener was released only in the United States and Canada, on the Dunhill label, distributed by ABC. It was conceived as a North American alternative to November 1969's Valentyne Suite, complete with a muted, blue-green variation of the aforementioned album's cover. It features four tracks recorded with then-new guitarist/vocalist Dave "Clem" Clempson in the winter of 1969 ("Jumping Off the Sun", "Lost Angeles", "Rope Ladder to the Moon", "Bolero"); three tracks from the 1969 Vertigo LP Valentyne Suite but with vocal and guitar parts provided by Clempson ("Butty's Blues", "The Machine Demands a Sacrifice", "The Grass Is Greener") instead of James Litherland; and one track, "Elegy", that appears to be the same as the original from Valentyne Suite, including Litherland's vocal. The record was remastered and released as a bonus disc in Sanctuary Records' 2003 deluxe CD edition of Valentyne Suite.

Reception

In a review of The Grass Is Greener at AllMusic, Jim Newsom said he was "impress[ed]" with Dick Heckstall-Smith's saxophones and woodwinds, and Dave Clempson's "blazing guitar licks". Newsom found "Jumping off the Sun" and Jack Bruce's "Rope Ladder to the Moon", "especially strong", and called the title track the "highlight of this disc".

Achim Breiling wrote at Babyblaue Seiten that in contrast to its predecessor, Valentyne Suite, The Grass Is Greener is a well balanced and diverse album. Breiling opined that, except for "Jumping off the Sun", which he felt is a little too "poppy", all the tracks are "beautiful", bluesy-jazz-rock songs, and some of Colosseum's best recorded numbers.

Track listing

Personnel
Dave Greenslade – organ, keyboards, vocals
Dick Heckstall-Smith – saxophone
Jon Hiseman – drums
Dave "Clem" Clempson – guitar, vocals
Tony Reeves – bass
James Litherland – vocals (on "Elegy")

References

1970 albums
Colosseum (band) albums
Albums produced by Gerry Bron
Dunhill Records albums